The Dirty Boogie is the third album from the swing band The Brian Setzer Orchestra. The album is considered as the breakthrough for the band, with their first single being a cover of Louis Prima's "Jump Jive an' Wail", which Prima had made popular in 1956 and included in his album The Wildest!. The release of the single came along after a Gap advertising campaign that featured Prima's original recording of the song. Each helped to propel the larger swing revival throughout the late 1990s and early 2000s. Seven of the album's tracks are covers of songs written and originally made popular between 1952 and 1962.

Structure and release
In addition to Prima's "Jump Jive An' Wail", covers include "This Old House" (Stuart Hamblen, 1954); "Since I Don't Have You" (The Skyliners, 1959); "Nosey Joe" (recorded by Bull Moose Jackson, written by Jerry Leiber and Mike Stoller, 1952); and "As Long As I'm Singin'" (Bobby Darin, 1962). "You're the Boss", also penned by Leiber and Stoller in 1961, is the album's seventh track, a duet featuring singer (and labelmate) Gwen Stefani; an earlier popular recording of the tune paired Elvis Presley and Ann-Margret. The eighth track, "Rock This Town", is a cover of a song originally recorded in 1981 by Brian Setzer's previous band, the Stray Cats. "Hollywood Nocturne" was a discarded track from Setzer's previous album, Guitar Slinger.

The album also features a cover of the instrumental "Sleep Walk", made popular originally by songwriters and performers Santo & Johnny Farina in 1959. Setzer's arrangement and recording won a Grammy Award the following year for best pop instrumental recording.

Paul Brandt later did a cover of the album's fourth track, "Let's Live It Up".

Album art 
The illustration and logo for The Dirty Boogie was created by Sir Richard Wentworth, using techniques such as pen and ink linework and cut rubylith sheets. The album cover began life as a show poster designed by Wentworth to advertise a Brian Setzer Orchestra concert at Detroit's State Theater (currently The Fillmore Detroit). After Brian Setzer saw the poster, he commissioned Wentworth to reformat the poster and to create a new logo for the band. The angular, kinetic style employed in Wentworth's illustration sparked a trend of identifying the music of the swing revival with the visual signifiers of the cartoon modern style (a type of dynamic, minimal design commonly used in 1950s and 1960s limited animation). Wentworth's retro logotype is still an essential part of the Brian Setzer Orchestra's brand identity and has inspired a commercial font called "Swinger". Wentworth also illustrated the covers for Setzer's Best of The Big Band (Japan Only CD), Boogie Woogie Christmas and Christmas Rocks! CDs, and designed the logo for The Ultimate Christmas Collection CD.

Track listing

Personnel

Musicians
Brian Setzer - guitar, vocals
Ernie Nunez, Tony Garnier - bass
Bernie Dresel - drums, percussion
Don Roberts, Ray Herrmann, Rick Rossi, Steve Marsh, Tim Misica - saxophone
George McMulen, Mark Jones, Michael Vlatkovich, Robbie Hioki - trombone
Dan Fornero, Dennis Farias, John Fumo, Kevin Norton - trumpet

Additional Musicians
Gwen Stefani – guest vocalist (track 7)
Mark W. Winchester – bass (track 7)
Eddie Nichols, Meghan Ivey – backing vocals (track 7)
Bob Parr – bass (track 12)
Roger Burn – piano (track 12)
Bob Sandman, George Shelby, Steve Fowler – saxophone (track 12)
Charlie Biggs, Stan Watkins – trumpet (track 12)

Technical
Peter Collins – producer
Phil Ramone – producer (track 12)
John Holbrook – engineer
Allen Sides – engineer (track 12)
Cliff Norrel, David Nottingham – assistant engineers
Brad Haehnel – assistant engineer (track 12)

Chart positions

Notes 

1998 albums
The Brian Setzer Orchestra albums
Albums produced by Peter Collins (record producer)
Interscope Records albums